Dick the Mockingbird was the name of one of U.S. president Thomas Jefferson's pet birds. Although there had been previous presidential pets, Jefferson is thought to be "the first president to have a pet [that lived] in the White House..." Prior to his term in the Oval Office, Jefferson bought his first mockingbird in November 1772 from a slave of his father-in-law John Wayles for five shillings. Birds were Jefferson's favorite animal and Dick was the favorite from among at least four mockingbirds the president had while in office. During his time in the White House, Jefferson wrote observations on the types of birds that he spotted in the area.  In May 1793, in response to a letter from his son-in-law Thomas Mann Randolph, Jefferson wrote: "I sincerely congratulate you on the arrival of the mockingbird. Teach all the children to venerate it as a superior being which will haunt them if any harm is done to itself or its eggs."

As a pet
Jefferson was noted to have kept Dick's cage in a special area in his study among plants on a windowsill where he would often leave the cage open allowing him free range of the room. The mockingbird was known to perch on Jefferson's couch and sing him to sleep after following him step-by-step up the stairs.  Dick liked to sit on Jefferson's shoulder as he worked at his desk in the study.  Jefferson had even trained the bird to swoop down and take food from between his lips. When Jefferson started playing his violin, Dick would "pour out his song along with the violin," as in a duet.

An acquaintance of Jefferson wrote, "How he loved the bird! He could not live without something to love… his bird and his flowers became the objects of his tender care."

See also
United States presidential pets
List of individual birds

References

Individual songbirds
Presidency of Thomas Jefferson
United States presidential pets